Chlorurus bleekeri, known commonly as Bleeker's parrotfish, is a species of marine fish in the family Scaridae.

Bleeker's parrotfish is widespread throughout the tropical waters of the central Indo-Pacific region. It feeds on filamentous algae. It is a medium-sized fish and can reach a maximum size of 49 cm length. Males are more colorful than females.

Etymology
The fish is named in honor of the Dutch medical doctor and ichthyologist Pieter Bleeker,  who identified this species as Scarus quoyi in 1853.

References

External links
http://www.marinespecies.org/aphia.php?p=taxdetails&id=277504
 

bleekeri
Taxa named by Lieven Ferdinand de Beaufort
Fish described in 1940